Cristo Rey De La Salle East Bay High School is a work of the San Francisco New Orleans District of the De La Salle Brothers. Opened in 2018, it is a member of the national Cristo Rey Network of work-study schools for underserved Hispanic Asian American and African American students. The new school occupies the former premises of St. Elizabeth High School in the Fruitvale District of Oakland, California, where the majority of the households are currently Hispanic. The purpose of the school is to provide an affordable, college prep education to needy students in the depressed area of inner-city Oakland, the underserved families of the East Bay.  The athletic program of Cristo Rey participates in the CIF North Coast Section as a non-league affiliate.

References

Further reading
 Kearney, G. R. More Than a Dream: The Cristo Rey Story: How One School's Vision Is Changing the World. Chicago, Ill: Loyola Press, 2008.

External links
 Cristo Rey Network

Cristo Rey Network
Catholic secondary schools in California
Lasallian schools in the United States
Educational institutions established in 2018
Poverty-related organizations
2018 establishments in California